The 1903 Massachusetts Aggies football team represented Massachusetts Agricultural College in the 1903 college football season. The team was coached by James Halligan and played its home games at Alumni Field in Amherst, Massachusetts. The 1903 season was Halligan's last as head coach of the Aggies. Massachusetts finished the season with a record of 5–4.

Schedule

References

Massachusetts
UMass Minutemen football seasons
Massachusetts Aggies football